Warisfistan is a village in the Leh district of Ladakh, India. It is located in the Nubra tehsil, on the bank of Siachin third glacier River. The Chogling Gompa is located nearby.

Demographics
According to the 2011 census of India, Warisfistan has 52 households. The effective literacy rate (i.e. the literacy rate of population excluding children aged 6 and below) is 35.19%.

References

Villages in Nubra tehsil